This is a list of Time Team episodes from series 21.

Series 21 (Season 21) of Time Team follows two new digs, each released in extended 3-part episodes exclusively on the Time Team Official YouTube channel. The first dig explores a mysterious Iron Age site in Cornwall; the second investigates a huge Roman villa on the estate of a Tudor castle in Oxfordshire.

Episode

Series 21

Episode # refers to the air date order.

References

External links
Official new Time Team website

Time Team (Series 21)
2020s YouTube series